Pridden is a hamlet in west Cornwall, England, United Kingdom.

It is located approximately one mile northeast of St Buryan village on the B3283 road. There is an area of woodland and a farm of the same name.

References

Penwith
Hamlets in Cornwall